Josephina is a female name, a feminine form of Joseph. Some nicknames include Josie, Jo, Joe, and Jopie.

Notable people 
Josephina "Jopie" Troost (born 1942), Dutch swimmer
 (1898–1965), Dutch actress

Other 
 303 Josephina, an asteroid
 Josephina (road), a Croatian road
Josephina the Whale, a Japanese anime television series

See also
 Joe (disambiguation)
 Josefina (disambiguation)
 Josephine (disambiguation)

Dutch feminine given names